Ernest Frederick Watermeyer, PC, QC (12 October 1880 – 18 January 1958), was the Chief Justice of South Africa from 1943 to 1950.

Watermeyer was born in Graaff-Reinet in 1880. He was educated at Stellenbosch Gymnasium, Bath College and Gonville and Caius College, Cambridge, where he read Mathematics, then Law.

He was called to the bar in England by the Inner Temple in 1904, and admitted to the Cape bar in 1905. He became a King's Counsel in 1921. From 1922 to 1937, he was a judge of the Cape Provincial Division of the Supreme Court of South Africa. In 1937, he was promoted to the Supreme Court's Appellate Division.

In 1943, he was appointed Chief Justice of South Africa and was sworn of the Privy Council the same year, the last Chief Justice of South Africa to be made a Privy Counsellor. He served as Officer Administering the Government of the Union of South Africa in 1950, and retired the same year.

References

Chief justices of South Africa
1880 births
1958 deaths
Alumni of Gonville and Caius College, Cambridge
South African members of the Privy Council of the United Kingdom
Members of the Inner Temple
South African Queen's Counsel
South African judges